Bush on the Couch: Inside the Mind of the President is a 2004 book by psychoanalyst Justin A. Frank. The central premise of Frank's book is that President George W. Bush displays signs of poor mental health which makes him ill-suited to rule the United States. Frank suggests Bush suffers from megalomania, that he is probably incapable of true compassion and shows signs of sadism, and that as an untreated alcoholic, is in constant danger of a relapse. Further, in Frank's opinion, Bush manifests the symptoms of a "dry drunk", principally irritability, judgmentalism and a rigid, inflexible world view. Frank also analyses, among other things, Bush's tendency to mix up his metaphors and concludes Bush has substantial problems with abstract, flexible thinking.

An updated version of the book was released in October 2007, including a new introduction and a new afterword.

Critical analysis of the book

Bush on the Couch has received endorsements from such distinguished professors of psychiatry as Irvin Yalom of Stanford University and James Grotstein (UCLA), who calls it a "remarkable – and frightening – piece of careful scholarship."
 
Frank's book also has its detractors. Writing for the conservative magazine The Weekly Standard, Irwin Savodnik, a psychiatrist who teaches at the University of California, Los Angeles, described Frank's book as a "psychoanalytic hatchet job" and said that "there is not an ounce of psychoanalytic material in the entire book." The code of the American Psychiatric Association, of which Frank is not a current member, states that "it is unethical for a psychiatrist to offer a professional opinion unless he or she has conducted an examination and has been granted proper authorization for such a statement."
Although Frank had in the past written for Salon, the online magazine reviewed the book unfavorably, arguing that it included "dubious theories" and that Frank had failed in his avowed intention to distinguish his partisan opinions from his psychoanalytic evaluation of Bush's character.

However, in interviews Frank freely admits his partisan affiliation, but claims his book is in a tradition of psychological assessments of leaders frequently undertaken, for example, by the CIA. Frank also claims that some of his readers have reacted to his book by gaining increased sympathy for Bush; for example, Joan Baez admitted this to Frank.

Reviews
History News Network Review 
Shrinking the President: A mind is a dangerous thing to psychoanalyze, The Weekly Standard, September 19, 2004
The inner W, Salon, June 16, 2004

Impact
Frank's book Bush on the Couch: Inside the Mind of the President was extensively quoted from by Fidel Castro in his annual speech in 2004.

See also
The Dangerous Case of Donald Trump

References
Notes

Bibliography

World Internet News: Interview with Dr. Justin Frank, April 2006.
Bush, George W., A Charge to Keep, William Morrow, New York 1999. 

Frank, Justin, Bush on the Couch, Regan Books, New York 2004 
Gould, Lewis L. (editor), American First Ladies: Their Lives and Their Legacy, Garland Publishing, New York and London, 1996 
Lardner, George Jr. and Romano, Lois, July 26, 1999. "Tragedy Created Mother-Son Bond", The Washington Post.
Minutaglio, Bill, First Son: George W. Bush and the Bush Family Dynasty, Crown Books, New York 1999 

2004 books
On the Couch
Psychological studies of heads of state